Lourde may refer to:

Lourde, Haute-Garonne, a commune in the Haute Garonne department, France
Lourde (river), a river in the Dordogne department, France

See also

Lorde (disambiguation) 

Lourdes (disambiguation)